Qomqaleh (also Romanized as Qomqal‘eh and Qom Qal‘eh) is a village in Mokriyan-e Gharbi Rural District, in the Central District of Mahabad County, West Azerbaijan Province, Iran. At the 2006 census, its population was 2,572, in 552 families.

References 

Populated places in Mahabad County